Dorogobuzh is a town in Smolensk Oblast, Russia.

Dorogobuzh may also refer to:

 Dorogobuzh (Rivne Oblast), a big village in Rivne Oblast, Ukraine
 , a village in Batetsky District, Novgorod Oblast, Russia